Clonycavan Man is the name given to a well-preserved Iron Age bog body found in Clonycavan, Ballivor, County Meath, Ireland in March 2003. The body shows signs of having been murdered. Theories around the meanings and manner of his death vary.

Condition and characteristics
Only Clonycavan Man's head and torso are preserved. He was found in a modern peat harvesting machine, which was possibly responsible for the severing of his lower body. 

Scientific study of Clonycavan Man's hair has shed light on his diet leading up to his death. His diet was rich in vegetables and proteins, which indicates that he may have been killed during the warmer summer months of the year. Clonycavan Man was also fairly young at the time of his death; he is believed to have been in his early twenties. 

The most distinguishing feature of the man was his hairstyle, which was raised upon his head with the help of a "hair gel" of plant oil and pine resin, imported from south-western France or Northern Spain. Remnants of a hair tie was also found on the corpse. This may attest to trade between Ireland and southern Europe in the fourth and third centuries BCE, before Roman influence was brought to bear on the Celts of Iberia. This could also suggest that he was wealthy, as few others would have been able to buy imported cosmetics. The hairstyle was possibly a way to make the man appear taller, as examination of his remains suggests that he was only five feet two inches tall (157.48 cm).

He had a squashed nose and crooked teeth. Pores are visible on the nose, and he had a thin beard.

Death

Clonycavan Man is believed to have been murdered, based on an examination of the evidence found on his body by the Garda Technical Bureau (Irish Police Forensic Division). His skull looks to have been split open by a sharp implement. There is a deep wound on the top of his head, and parts of his brain have been found in this wound. There is also a large laceration across the bridge of his nose leading under his right eye. This is believed to be the blow that killed him. Both injuries seem to have been caused by the same sharp implement, most likely an axe. He was also disembowelled. 

The reasons for his killing are unknown, but it is theorized by some that he was a ritual sacrifice of some type. His nipples and other body parts that consist of fragile tissue were missing, which could be from natural decomposition, or possibly mutilation. A hill that could possibly have been used for kingship ceremonies was near the bog where Clonycavan Man was found, leading to further speculation about the body.

Radiocarbon dating has placed his death to between 392 BC and 201 BC, during the Iron Age of western Europe, making his remains around 2,300 years old.

Display 
Clonycavan Man has formed part of an exhibit in the National Museum of Ireland in Dublin - and featured in the exhibition "Kingship and Sacrifice", 2006-2007.

See also 
 List of bog bodies

References 

2003 archaeological discoveries
Archaeological sites in County Meath
Bog bodies
Bogs of Ireland
Celtic archaeological sites
Collection of the National Museum of Ireland
Forensic palynology
People from County Meath
Pre-Roman Iron Age
Year of birth unknown
Year of death uncertain